Zona pellucida sperm-binding protein 1 is a protein that cross-links ZP2 and ZP3. Aberrant ZP1 results in sequestration of ZP3 in the cytoplasm, thereby preventing the formation of the zona pellucida around the oocyte.

References

Human proteins